Mansfield Rugby Club is an English rugby union team based in Mansfield, Nottinghamshire. The club runs four senior sides, a colts team and eleven junior sides. The first XV currently plays in Midlands 3 East (North), a sixth tier league in the English rugby union system.

History
Mansfield Rugby Club was formed in 1956 and by 1977 the club had bought its own ground at Eakring Road. The club was placed in Midlands 1 when the league system was introduced in 1987. A reorganisation of the leagues resulted in the club moving to Midlands 2 East but Mansfield has since gained two promotions, moving into National 3 Midlands in 2011. However recent seasons have seen several relegations and the club is now playing at a level similar to where the club was a decade earlier.

Club honours
Midlands Division 2 East champions: 2003-04
Midlands 3 East (North) champions: 2007-08
Midlands 1 (east v west) promotion playoff winners: 2010-11

References

External links
Official club website

English rugby union teams
1956 establishments in England
Rugby clubs established in 1956
Rugby union in Nottinghamshire
Sport in Mansfield